Moghreb Atlético Tetuán  (acronym MAT) is a Moroccan football club based in Tétouan. MA Tétouan was founded in 1922 and used to compete in the Tétouan local compétitions till 1956 when Morocco gained independence from Spain as the club made its transition to the Moroccan league.

History

Foundation and first years (1922–1956) 
The founding date of the club, according to known records, particularly in several books written by Ahmed Mghara, dates back to 1926. However, according to several elderly people from the city, the club took over from the old Club Atlético Tetuán, which was created in 1922.
North Cup
It was during the period of Mr. President Mohamed Medina and his deputy Abdelatif Ghaylan that the Moghreb had just been crowned for the first time in its history by winning the Cup of the North.

After independence (Since 1956) 
After the Independence of Morocco, the club have a new committee and find themselves in the northern group to play the play-offs to join the elite of the Moroccan league. And since then, the club have played 14 top-flight seasons and 34 in the 2nd division. The Moghreb Athletic of Tetouan wins for the first time in its history the Moroccan championship, (which is for the first time a professional championship). This title was won at the end of the last day on the ground of his runner-up on FUS Rabat (Fath), on 28 May 2012. It was a historic moment for the club which not only won the title but also experienced the largest displacement of supporters (over 45,000 people) in the history of Moroccan football.

Sunday May 25, 2014 will go down in history. The club won its second championship against Raja de Casablanca. During the 29th matchday, the two teams were tied (55 points) except that Raja, were leader of the standings. Raja was beaten by the OCS (Olympique de Safi) in Safi by 1 goal to zero while Moghreb from Tetouan, beat the rebirth of Berkane in Tetouan by 2 goals to 1. This consecration allows him to participate for the first time in its history at the world club championship which was organized in Morocco in December 2014.

In 2nd division, the club won the championship 5 times from 1965 to 2005. He was also semi-finalist of the Cup of Morocco in 2008 against MAS de Fès and quarter-finalist twice in 1965 against the Moroccan stadium and in 1981 against the future finalist the CODM de Meknes.

Resurgence in the Moroccan pyramid (2011–2014)
Tetouan really began to move up the footballing pyramid in July 2011, though, when little known coach Aziz El Amri was appointed. His mission was to save the team from relegation, but he took them to their first ever championship title in 2012—a feat even more remarkable when you take into account that some of the senior players went on strike over unpaid wages, and Tetouan were forced to use inexperienced home grown youngsters instead. On the final day, they needed just a draw at FUS Rabat and won 1–0 to seal the trophy. Around 30,000 fans travelled with the team—the largest away crowd in Moroccan football history—and the celebrations were something to behold, that was the beginning of a new era in Moroccan football, the first ever Professional season of the Moroccan league and the birth of a new force in Moroccan football.

In context, 2012–13 was relatively mediocre as the team lost some of its key players who left the club as they only managed to finish 5th. But in the following season Tetouan were back in the title race again, knowing that success would be especially important with a place in the 2014 Club World Cup at stake for the winners. By the end of May, a phenomenal prospect was on cards: Atlético Madrid had qualified for the Champions League final, while Tetouan were in pole position to win the Moroccan league. It was not to be. First, Moghreb Tetouan were thrashed 5–0 by Raja Casablanca in the big game on the penultimate day of the season, seemingly losing the crown. On 25 May, they celebrated wildly as Raja Casablanca sensationally lost to Olympic Safi on the final day, gifting the championship title to Tetouan.

The dream of facing Atlético Madrid was dead, but hopes of meeting "the other team from Madrid" were very much alive. In 2001, a friendly game had been scheduled between Moghreb Tetouan and Real Madrid to mark the 60th anniversary of that famous 3–3 draw in the Primera Division, only for the plans to be cancelled by Los Blancos due to some logistical problems, then again in 2012 but everything got cancelled again.

The 2014 Club World Cup and the end of El Amri's era
Moghreb Tetouan's reward for winning the 2013–2014 season of the Moroccan championship, Botola was a place in the 2014 FIFA Club World Cup in Morocco, their debut in the competition.

Their debut ended in disappointment after getting eliminated on the preliminary round as they went down on penalties to Auckland City FC, the side that has made more appearances in the competition than any other.

Due to Moghreb Tétouan's continuous poor performances in the Moroccan league (earning just two points from the last five fixtures before the Club World Cup) and against Auckland City FC, due mostly to poor decisions and bad strategies made by the manager, El Amri was sacked.

Sergio Lobera and African success (2015–16 )
On December 24, 2014 Sergio Lobera was appointed as the new Moghreb Atletico Tetouan head coach and successor of El Amri, joined by 2 Spaniards in the club's technical team Juanma Cruz as the goalkeeper coach and Manuel Sayabera as the Physical trainer and later joined by David Martin as the inferior categories' coach, it didn't take long for the players to adapt to Lobera's philosophy, displaying unprecedented maturity and self-confidence, the team was back on track and started winning again, thanks to Lobera's brilliant strategies and his emphasis on teamwork, the team managed to pull off a historic African Champions League campaign after getting through the preliminary round for the first time (the team failed to do so under El Amri) after defeating Club Olympique de Bamako, (3–2), Kano Pillars in the first round (5–2) and then Al Ahly (1(4) – 1(3)) in the second round therefore making it to the Groups Stage for the first ever for the club (and since 10 years for a Moroccan club)

In the Groups Stage Tetouan had a terrible start, in their first away game in Egypt against Smouha SC they had a 2 goals lead but conceded 3 goals in the last half-hour of the game therefore losing 3 – 2, the second game was a goalless tie against TP Mazembe at home soil, the third game ended with a 1 – 1 tie with Al-Hilal at home again however Tetouan managed to win an away game for the first time in Sudan, beating Al-Hilal in their home ground, It was the first time since the Sudani club loses in their home ground since 2011, (the score was 1 – 0) thus moving up from the last position to the 3rd, then to the 1st after beating Smouha SC 2 – 1 at home soil.

Kit
Traditionally the home kit features the iconic red and white stripe design accompanied by blue shorts and red socks, this combination has been used since 1947 and is still in use today, although sometimes blue socks are used instead. What's worth mentioning is that the club wore black socks instead at first (1922–1947).
The club of course got its colours from its Spanish twin club Atlético Madrid. The away kit colours generally differs from one season to another but is usually black with white and red applications.

The kit has been made by many brands like Nike, Le Coq Sportif, King Sports among others, The current main shirt sponsor is Abroun, a company owned by the club's president, Abelmalek Abroun, while LG Electronics, Maroc Telecom and Radio Mars all have minor sponsorship on the shirt.

Home ground
Whilst it is almost certain that football was played on the site of the Estadio de Varela from the turn of the 20th century, the land was not formally enclosed until 1913. Situated on the north bank of the River Martil, the stadium played host to a variety of sports thanks to the inclusion of a cinder athletics track. Rudimentary bleachers were added once Atlético started to play in Campeonato Hispano-Marroquí, whilst officials could watch from a rather ornate raised, open terrace. This wedge shaped construction was double sided, so that one could view races at the hippodrome that stood to the west of the stadium. Atlético's ascent to La Primera led to the stadium undergoing major redevelopment. An open stand with bench terracing was erected on the east side which was linked to semi circular end terraces. Club office and changing rooms were built in the south west corner and the pitch was access via a tunnel behind the southern goal. The stadium's main tribuna was built on the west side, and this featured a vaulted concrete cantilevered roof. However, it was only 75 metres in length and ran from the southern touchline, before seemingly losing interest and petering out just after the halfway line. With a capacity of 15,000, Varela suited Atlético just fine, and it also seemed to suit Moghreb Tétouan just fine, as little was done to the stadium for the next 50 years.

In the intervening years, the stadium was renamed the Stade Saniat Rmel and in 2007, the parched turf was replaced with an artificial surface. Work on the original terraces saw the capacity reduced to 10,000, but then in 2011, to mark the 60th anniversary of the original club's promotion to La Primera, the main tribuna underwent a major refurbishment. A new framework was erected at the rear of the stand to support the original, ageing concrete roof. Everything was given a coat of red, white & blue paint and new bucket seats were bolted to the concrete steps. After 50 years of achieving very little, Moghreb Tétouan won its first Moroccan championship in May 2012. As the city celebrated the club's first major honour, the Ultras paraded banners celebrating the club's Spanish heritage, saying "Siempre Los Matadores" (Matadors Forever).

The Club's president has stated many times before that a new bigger stadium was under way, as thanks to the club's success in recent years more supporters started attending matches and the current stadium's capacity wasn't enough. In 2015 the construction on the new stadium officially started, the club's president Abdelmalek Abroun has stated that the new stadium will be a part of the new sports city and will have a capacity of about 40,000 seats

Affiliated clubs
 Atlético Madrid
 Granada CF

Club rivalries
 KAC Kenitra, one of the club's biggest rivalries, many incidents, where supporters lost their lives happened because of this long standing rivalry, the ultras also make chants dissing the rival club and supporters whenever the two clubs play.
 Raja Casablanca, a relatively new rivalry which started in the recent years and reached its peak during the 2013/2014 season, as both clubs were competing for the title, eventually won by Moghreb Tetouan.

The Northern Derby
 IR Tanger, the club of the neighbouring city, Tangiers, is considered the club's biggest rival, their encounter, referred to as the northern derby is one of the most anticipated matches of the Moroccan league, due to its value and great importance among supporters.

Ultras
Moghreb Tétouan has 2 "ultras" fan groups, Los Matadores since 2005 and Siempre Paloma since 2006, both are based in Tetouan and even though they had many conflicts over the years they managed to unite and are now in good terms as they sit next to each other and work united and cooperatively as Fondo Norte.

Moghreb Tetouan's supporters are known to be some of the most loyal, dedicated, organized and civilised supporters in Morocco, they're also known for their unique chants mixing Arabic and Spanish, in 2012 they broke the record of the largest away crowd in Moroccan football history when more than 30.000 fans travelled with the team to Rabat to face FUS Rabat on the last day of the Moroccan championship, a match they won to earn their first title.

Again on the opening day of the 2014 FIFA Club World Cup, Moghreb Tetouan was facing Auckland City FC in the preliminary round, a record breaking away crowd of more than 40,000 fans attended the match.

Sponsorship
 Maroc Telecom
 Halib Titawen
 Bang Sports
 LG Electronics
 Gold Vision
 Veolia Amendis
 Radio Mars

Current squad

Other players under contract

Managers

Spanish Era (1922–1956)
 Carlos Iturraspe (1953)
 Baltasar Albéniz (1953–1954)
 Antonio Barrios (1954–1955)

Moroccan Era (Post-1956) 
 Mohamed Fakhir (Dec 2007 – Jun 2008)
 Abderrahim Talib (2008 – 2009)
 Mohamed Fakhir (Jan – May 2010)
 Jean-François Jodar (May – Dec 2010)
 Aziz El Amri (Dec 2010 – Dec 2014)
 Sergio Lobera (Dec 2014 – May 2017)
 Amin Erbati (May 2017)
 Fouad Sahabi (Jun – Sep 2017)
 Abdelhak Benchikha (Sep – Nov 2017)
 Youssef Fertout (Nov 2017 – Feb 2018)
 Abdelouahid Benhssain (Feb 2018 – Feb 2019)
 Tarik Sektioui (Feb – Jul 2019)
 Ángel Viadero (Aug 2019 – Feb 2020)
 Jamaleddine Drideb (Feb – Sep 2020)
 Zoran Manojlović (Sep – Oct 2020)
 Juanjo Maqueda (Oct – Dec 2020)
 Jamaleddine Drideb (Dec 2020 – Jan 2021)
 Younes Ben Lahmar (Jan – Feb 2021)
 Jamaleddine Drideb (Feb – Jul 2021)
 Toni Cosano (Jul – Sep 2021)
 Abdellatif Jrindou (Sep 2021 – Dec 2022)
 Reda Hakam (Dec 2022 – Feb 2023)
 Jamaleddine Drideb (Feb 2023 – )

Honours
Botola
Champions: 2011–12, 2013–14
Botola 2
Champions: 1957–58, 1969–70, 1989–90, 1994–95, 2004–05, 2021–22
Moroccan Throne Cup
Runners-Up: 2019-20
Segunda División
Champions: 1950–51

Bibliography
 Tetuán y su Atlético by Julio Parres Aragonés (L'Hospitalet: el author, 1997).

See also
 Atlético Madrid
 Atlético San Luis
 Atlético Ottawa
 Athletic Bilbao
 Atlético Tetuán
 AD Ceuta FC
 IR Tanger
 Atlético Junior

References

External links

Official Website
Estadios de España 

 
Moghreb Tetouani
Association football clubs established in 1956
Tétouan
1956 establishments in Morocco
Sports clubs in Morocco
1922 establishments in Morocco